Edgeville may refer to:

Edgeville, Florida
Edgeville, a fictional town in the online game RuneScape